Walter Gerhard Forster (March 23, 1917 – September 3, 1996) was a Brazilian actor. He was born in Campinas to Jacob Forster, of German and Irish descent, and Ida Forster, a Swiss woman. Starting his career as an announcer in Rádio Educadora de Campinas in 1935, Forster worked on several radio stations, including Bandeirantes, Difusora, Excelsior, and Nacional. In 1951, he created and acted in the first Brazilian telenovela, Sua Vida Me Pertence, in which he performed the first on-screen kiss ever aired on Brazilian television with co-star, Vida Alves.

He was married to Branca Regina from 1942 to 1983, when she died, with whom he had a daughter, Suzana, and a son, Walter Júnior. Forster died on São Paulo from heart attack.

Filmography

References

External links 

1917 births
1996 deaths
Brazilian people of German descent
Brazilian people of Irish descent
Brazilian people of Swiss-German descent
People from Campinas
20th-century Brazilian male actors